Winnipeg Lucania Football Club is an amateur soccer club based in Winnipeg, Manitoba.  It was founded in 1971.  They won gold at the Canadian National Challenge Cup on two occasions, in 1987 and 2000.  The club was ranked the number one senior men's amateur team in Canada on June 22, 2011.

Honours

Canadian National Challenge Cup
Gold Medal - 2000, 1987
3rd place - 1997, 1991, 1989
MSA Cup
 Champion - 1987, 1991, 1994, 1997, 1999, 2000, 2001, 2004, 2005, 2006, 2010
Manitoba Major Soccer League
 Champion - 2008

Molson Super Soccer Alliance
Champion - 1991

References

Official Site
League Site

Soccer clubs in Winnipeg
1971 establishments in Manitoba
Association football clubs established in 1971